Psilurus is a genus of Eurasian and North African plants in the grass family.

Species
The only known species is Psilurus incurvus, native to the Mediterranean and southwest Asia from Portugal and Morocco to Pakistan and Uzbekistan. It is also naturalised in parts of Australia.

References

Pooideae
Monotypic Poaceae genera